Merrifieldia deprinsi is a moth of the family Pterophoridae that is found in Asia Minor.

The forewings and hindwings are cream white. The fringes are whitish.

Adults have been recorded in August.

References

Moths described in 1990
deprinsi
Moths of Asia